Manakosa Union is a union in the Shibganj Upazila of Chapai Nawabganj District in the Rajshahi Division of Bangladesh.

References 

Unions of Nawabganj District